Xestia retracta is a moth of the family Noctuidae. It is known from Sikkim.

References

Xestia
Moths of Asia